West Siang district (Pron:/ˈsjæŋ or ˈsɪæŋ/) is an administrative district in the state of Arunachal Pradesh in India.

History
In 1989, territory was given from West Siang to the East Siang district. Since 1999, this territory has been in the new Upper Siang district. Archaeological finds from Malinithan in West Siang are on display at the Jawaharlal Nehru Museum, Itanagar. It was once a part of the Chutiya kingdom. West Siang was divided into Upper Siang and Lower Siang. West Siang district was bifurcated on 9 December 2018 when northern areas along China border were made a separate Shi Yomi district.

Geography
The district headquarters is located at Aalo.

Transport
The  proposed Mago-Thingbu to Vijaynagar Arunachal Pradesh Frontier Highway along the McMahon Line will intersect with the proposed East-West Industrial Corridor Highway and will pass through this district, alignment map of which can be seen here and here.

Divisions
There are seven Arunachal Pradesh Legislative Assembly constituencies in this district: Liromoba, Likabali, Basar, Along West, Along East, Rumgong, and Mechuka. The first six are part of Arunachal West Lok Sabha constituency, while Mechuka is part of Arunachal East Lok Sabha constituency.

Demographics

Population
According to the 2011 Census, West Siang district has a population of 112,274, roughly equal to the nation of Grenada. This gives it a ranking of 612th in India (out of a total of 640). Its population growth rate over the decade 2001–2011 was 8.04%. West Siang has a sex ratio of 916 females for every 1000 males, and a literacy rate of 67.62%.

After bifurcation the residual West Siang district has a population of 58,182. Scheduled Tribes make up 46,204 (79.41%).

Various tribal groups of the Adi, Memba, and Khamba tribes live in the district. The Adi generally follow Donyi-Polo, although some have embraced Baptist Christianity in recent years. The Memba and Khamba are followers of Tibetan Buddhism.

Languages
Languages spoken include Adi, a Sino-Tibetan tongue with approximately 140 000 speakers, written in both the Tibetan and Latin scripts; and Galo, an endangered language with 30 000 speakers, also in the Sino-Tibetan language family.

70.41% of the population spoke Galo, 6.65% Hindi, 3.18% Nepali, 2.75% Adi, 2.63% Bengali, 2.34% Assamese, 2.17% Bhojpuri and 1.68% Miniyong as their first language.

Flora and fauna
The district is rich in wildlife. Rare mammals such as Mishmi takin, Snow leopards, Red pandas, and Musk deer occur while among birds there is the rare Blyth's Tragopan. A flying squirrel, new to science, has been recently discovered from this district. It has been named as Mechuka Giant Flying Squirrel.

References

External links 

 

 
Districts of Arunachal Pradesh